In mathematics, a Tychnoff axiom may be:
 the T3½ axiom that defines Tychonoff spaces; or
 any of the Tychonoff separation axioms.